Labordia hirtella, the mountain labordia, is a species of flowering plant in the Loganiaceae family. It is endemic to the Hawaiian Islands.  It is threatened by habitat loss.

References

hirtella
Endemic flora of Hawaii
Near threatened biota of Oceania
Taxonomy articles created by Polbot